The 1839 Philadelphia mayoral election saw John Swift return to office for a seventh overall non-consecutive term.

This was the first Philadelphia mayoral election in which members of the general public were able to vote. Prior to this, the City Council solely elected mayors of Philadelphia. Beginning in 1839, the city began to operate under a mixed electoral system. Citizens voted for mayor in a general election. If a candidate received a majority of the vote, they would be elected mayor. However, if no candidate received a majority, the City Council would select a mayor from the top-two finishers.

Results

General election

City Council (runoff)

References

1839
Philadelphia
Philadelphia mayoral
19th century in Philadelphia